Astino Abbey is a former Roman Catholic monastery in the Astino Valley, in the Province of Bergamo, region of Lombardy, Italy. It is no longer active. The buildings were restored in 2015.

History
Astino Abbey was founded around the year 1070 by a group of members of the Vallumbrosan Order led by John Gualbert during a time in which, through reforms, clerics were trying to revive the Catholic Church's position.

The Romanesque church and the first conventual buildings were built by Bertario, the first abbot, who supervised the abbey for 21 years until 1128.

The monastery was suppressed on 4 July 1797 by the civil authorities of Bergamo. Its assets were given to the nearby hospital, founded and previously run by the monks.

In 1832 the site was put to use as a psychiatric hospital, which it remained until 1892. It was then used for agricultural purposes, and was sold to private buyers in 1923.

In 1973 the property was acquired by a private company for conversion into a golfing centre, but the plan ran into so much opposition that it never came to fruition, and the monastery buildings had been left neglected until 2015.

Church
The Church of "Santo Sepolcro" (of the Holy Sepulchre) was consecrated in 1117, but had been rebuilt over the centuries. The base of the belltower dates to the 12th-century, but now has a baroque superstructure. The building includes a cloister of the 15th century and a chapel to the memory of Blessed Guallo de Roniis, exiled bishop of Brescia.

References

Bibliography
Fulvio Adobati, Moris Lorenzi. Astino e la sua valle. Clusone, Ferrari editrice, 1997.
Maria Luisa Angelini. I monasteri di Bergamo. Bergamo, La Rivista di Bergamo, 1979.
Manela Bandini. La Valle d'Astino, in Progetto il colle di Bergamo. Bergamo, Lubrina. 
Mario Locatelli. Bergamo nei suoi monasteri. Bergamo ed. Il Conventino, 1986.
Mario Lupo. Codex diplomaticus civitatis et ecclesiae Bergomatis. Bergamo, 1784–1788.
AA. VV. Il parco dei colli di Bergamo: introduzione alla conoscenza del terriotrio. Bergamo, 1986.
AA, VV. La presenza dei benedettini a Bergamo e nelle bergamasca. Bergamo, APB, 1984.

External links
   

Churches in the province of Bergamo
11th-century Roman Catholic church buildings in Italy
Romanesque architecture in Lombardy
Monasteries in Lombardy
Christian monasteries established in the 11th century